Snow Blind is a 2006 documentary film about the history, culture, and lifestyle of snowboarding. Shot over the season of 2004–2005, the film covers the origins of snowboarding, the evolution of it into an Olympic sport and the passionate participants, thrill seekers and competitors.

The film was released on December 8, 2006. It was filmed on location in Colorado and Utah and shot entirely in HD.

Synopsis 
The film is segmented into six major thematic sections:
 Inventors: The individuals who started creating snowboards
 Pioneers: The individuals who started riding snowboards before it was a sport
 Back Country: The individuals who risk their lives riding in non-designated snowboarding areas
 Pros: The teen and twenty-something professional athletes and Olympians
 Adaptors: The individuals who have lost limbs or their eyesight but continue to snowboard
 Families: Interviews the Teters and how snowboarding has influenced their lives

The film also has one mini section on Banana George, a 93-year-old snowboarder.

Subjects 
 Hannah Teter
 Abe Teter
 JJ Thomas
 Brent Meyer
 Jeff Meyer
 Rob Bak
 Ross Powers
 Jeff Cormak
 Steve Fisher
 Louie Vito
 Steve Hayes
 Tina Basich
 Banana George

Music 
 The Prodigy
 The Donnas
 Orbital
 Carl Cox
 Roni Size
 GZA

External links 

 Official web site
 

2006 films
American independent films
American sports documentary films
2000s English-language films
2000s American films